The New Hampshire Wildcats represented the University of New Hampshire in Women's Hockey East Association play during the 2014–15 NCAA Division I women's ice hockey season.

Offseason
August 6: Karyn Bye Dietz ('93) was elected into the US Hockey Hall of Fame

Recruiting

Roster

2014–15 Wildcats

Schedule

|-
!colspan=12 style=""| Regular Season

|-
!colspan=12 style=""| WHEA Tournament

References

New Hampshire
New Hampshire Wildcats women's ice hockey seasons
New Ham
New Ham